Chinese military operations other than war (MOOTW) focus on deterring war, resolving conflict, promoting peace, and supporting civil authorities in response to domestic crises.

The non-traditional missions of the Chinese armed forces have evolved as an increasingly used tool of statecraft. China has deployed forces in more than a dozen UN peacekeeping missions, and has committed over 3,000 personnel to UN peacekeeping operations.

The People's Liberation Army (PLA) established specialized forces for military operations other than war. Current planning anticipates five specialized groups, including (a) flood and disaster relief forces, (b) post-earthquake emergency rescue forces, (c) emergency rescue forces for nuclear, chemical and biological disasters, (d) emergency relief force for transportation facilities and (e) international peacekeeping force.

MOOTW have been a subject of study at the National Defense University (NDU), which became a venue for examining the practical experience of equipment utilization and support. The characteristics, rules, contents and methods of equipment utilization and support in MOOTW were evaluated.

Select Chinese deployments

 Somali pirates, 2009: Naval escort missions in waters off Somalia.

See also 
 Pax Sinica
 Five Principles of Peaceful Coexistence
 China and the United Nations
 Chinese foreign aid

References

Citations

Sources 

 Hellström, Jerker.  "Blue Berets under the Red Flag: China in the UN Peacekeeping System", Swedish Defence Research Agency (FOI) 2009
 Ling, Bonny.  "China's Peacekeeping Diplomacy," China Rights Forum. No. 1, 2007.
 Ministry of National Defense of the People's Republic of China: Military operations other than war;  China's Participation in UN Peacekeeping Operations

People's Liberation Army
Peacekeeping
Military operations other than war